The Conspiracy (French: Mademoiselle 100 millions) is a 1913 French silent crime film directed by Maurice Tourneur.

Cast
 André Dubosc as Marquis de Kermor
 Jeanne Bérangère as Sidonia de Bressieu
 Damorès as Henri de Kermor
 Jane Maylianes as Jeanne de Brenn
 Bahier as Baron de Bressieu
 Henri Gouget as Secrétaire Delrue

References

Bibliography
 Mary Lea Bandy. Rediscovering French Film. Museum of Modern Art, 1983.

External links

1913 films
Films directed by Maurice Tourneur
French silent feature films
French crime films
1910s crime films
French black-and-white films
1910s French films